Lighthouse (released as Dead of Night in the United States) is a 1999 British horror film directed by Simon Hunter. The film follows survivors of a shipwreck being preyed on by an escaped psychotic convict who beheads his victims. It was shot in Cornwall for the main locations (lighthouse, beaches rockshores), and Hastings in East Sussex.

Plot

A prison ship on its way to a remote island prison runs aground on rocks and sinks. Mixed survivors of cons and prison guards struggle ashore, only to discover to their horror that another survivor has made it ashore before them. Murderous psychotic Leo Rook not only had a hand in the ship's sinking but has decapitated all but one of the island's lighthouse crew. Stranded, with no means of escape or way to call for help, the survivors must face a night of terror. They know Leo does not want anyone to learn he survived the shipwreck and is hell-bent on adding their severed heads to his collection.

Cast
 James Purefoy as Richard Spader
 Christopher Adamson as Leo Rook
 Rachel Shelley as Dr. Kirsty McCloud
 Don Warrington as Prison Officer Ian Goslet
 Paul Brooke as Captain Campbell
 Chris Dunne as Chief Prison Officer O'Neil 
 Pat Kelman as Spoons
 Bob Goody as Weevil
 Peter McCabe as Prison Officer Hopkins
 Norman Mitchell as Brownlow
 Howard Attfield as Sykes
 Jason Round as Spitfield
 Sarah Wateridge as McCloud's Mother
 Rod Woodruff as Guard

Release

Home media
The film was released on DVD under its alternate title Dead of Night by Image Entertainment on 30 May 2000. It was later released by VVL on 21 April 2003.

Reception

Peter Bradshaw from The Guardian gave the film a negative review, calling it "[a] straightforward, unimaginative slasher picture". Shephen Holden from The New York Times called it "[a] grade-C British horror thriller", but also stated that the film was not without its crude pretensions. Kim Newman from Empire awarded the film a negative two out of five stars, calling it "uneven". Dennis Dermody of TV Guide gave the film one out of four stars, calling it a "lame British horror picture, which features plenty of arterial spray but few scares." Jamie Russell from BBC rated the film two out of five stars, stating that the film's promising start was ruined by hammy acting, an unnecessary romantic sub-plot, and a lack of explanation for the killer's actions.

References

External links
 
 
 

1999 films
1999 horror films
1990s psychological thriller films
British slasher films
British horror films
Films set on islands
Films shot at Pinewood Studios
Films shot in Cornwall
Works set in lighthouses
1990s English-language films
1990s British films